
Gmina Godziszów is a rural gmina (administrative district) in Janów Lubelski County, Lublin Voivodeship, in eastern Poland.

Villages
Gmina Godziszów contains the villages and settlements of Andrzejów, Godziszów, Kawęczyn, Piłatka, Rataj Ordynacki, Rataj Poduchowny, Wólka Ratajska and Zdziłowice.

Neighbouring gminas
Gmina Godziszów is bordered by the gminas of Batorz, Chrzanów, Dzwola, Janów Lubelski, Modliborzyce and Zakrzew.

References

Polish official population figures 2006

Godziszow
Janów Lubelski County